Coregonus megalops is a putative species of whitefish, part of the Coregonus lavaretus complex (European whitefish). Its distribution is in Sweden, Finland, and Russia.

In Sweden, the name C. megalops has referred to a form of whitefish known as the blåsik ("blue whitefish"). That is however no more considered a distinct species but a morphotype of Coregonus maraena ("Coregonus maraena morphotype megalops"), and not different from "Coregonus maraena morphotype nilssoni".

References

megalops